The Plum Grove Primitive Methodist Church is located in Ridgeway, Wisconsin. It was added to the National Register of Historic Places in 1995.

References

Churches on the National Register of Historic Places in Wisconsin
Methodist churches in Wisconsin
Churches in Iowa County, Wisconsin
Carpenter Gothic church buildings in Wisconsin
Churches completed in 1882
National Register of Historic Places in Iowa County, Wisconsin